Ri Kum-chol is the name of:

Ri Kum-chol (footballer, born unknown)
Ri Kum-chol (footballer, born 1987)
Ri Kum-chol (footballer, born 1991)